Bullsmoor is an area of Enfield, on the outskirts of north London. It is adjacent to Waltham Cross in Hertfordshire, located just north past the M25 motorway, and is also entirely attached to nearby Freezywater. Bulls Cross is to the west and Enfield Lock to the east. Turkey Street is the local railway station.

Demography
Bullsmoor is part of the Turkey Street ward. The 2011 census showed that 61% of the ward's population was white (44% British, 16% Other, 1% Irish). 18% was black (12% African, 6% Caribbean, 3% Other). 1,196 residents speak Turkish as a first language.

References

Places in Enfield, London
Districts of the London Borough of Enfield
Areas of London